The 2016 New Hampshire Senate election was held on November 8, 2016, concurrently with the elections for the New Hampshire House of Representatives, to elect members to the 165th New Hampshire General Court. All 24 seats in the New Hampshire Senate were up for election. It resulted in Republicains maintaining control of both chambers of the New Hampshire General Court.

In addition, Republican Chris Sununu won the open 2016 New Hampshire gubernatorial election giving the New Hampshire Republican Party total control of the state government for the first time since Republican Governor Craig Benson was defeated by Democrat John Lynch in the 2004 New Hampshire gubernatorial election. Furthermore, Democratic nominee Hillary Clinton was able to win the state in 2016 Presidential election by fewer than 3,000 votes (0.4%) and Democrat Maggie Hassan won 2016 United States Senate election by around 1,000 votes (0.2%).
 
Primary elections were held on September 13, 2016.

Background 
In the 2014 New Hampshire state elections, Republicans expanded their majority in the New Hampshire Senate to a margin of 14–10. Republicans also gained control of the New Hampshire House of Representatives. On the other hand, incumbent Democratic Governor Maggie Hassan was able to secure a second two-year term preventing total Republican control.

Campaign 
A major issue of the campaign was the long planned extension of MBTA's Lowell Line from Lowell towards Nashua, Manchester and Concord as part of the so called Capital Corridor. Democratic candidates for the General Court were overwhelmingly in favor of the project, while most Republican candidates were opposed. One exception was Daniel Innis, Republican nominee in the 24th district, who stated that "[The project] clearly adds value." The 2016 elections were seen as crucial for the project. In case the project would get political approval, the State of New Hampshire was expected at the time to pay around $72 million of $245.6 million for the construction of the line as well as between $3 Million to $5 million per year for the operation of it.

Results

Analysis 
Despite Hillary Clinton carrying New Hampshire by a small margin in the simultaneous 2016 United States Presidential election, Democrats were not able to achieve significant gains in New Hampshire's state legislature. In total, just two seats changed hands between the parties. On the one hand, State Senate District 7, which was carried by Donald Trump by a 54-40 margin, switched from the Democrats to the Republicans. On the other hand, Democrats flipped State Senate District 16, which was carried by Hillary Clinton by a 48-47 margin.

A total of four districts elected a Senator of a different party than the party of the presidential nominee that the district. State Senate Districts 1 and 18 reelected their Democratic Senators, despite being carried by Donald Trump. On the other hand, State Senate Districts 9 and 24 reelected their Republican Senators, despite being carried by Hillary Clinton.

Overview 

Source: Official results.

Detailed results

District 1
Incumbent Democratic State Senator Jeff Woodburn had represented the New Hampshire's 1st State Senate District since 2012. Senator Woodburn had also served as Senate Minority Leader since 2014. He won reelection against Republican Dolly McPhaul.

District 2
Incumbent Republican State Senator Jeanie Forrester had represented the New Hampshire's 2nd State Senate District since 2010. She did not run for reelection in 2016. The open seat was won by Republican Bob Giuda against Democrat Charlie Chandler.

District 3 

Incumbent Republican State Senator Jeb Bradley had represented the New Hampshire's 3rd State Senate District since 2009. He won reelection against Democrat John White.

District 4
Incumbent Democrat State Senator David Watters had represented the New Hampshire's 4th State Senate District since 2012. He won reelection against Republican Bill O'Connor.

District 5
Incumbent Democrat State Senator David Watters had represented the New Hampshire's 5th State Senate District since 2012. He did not run for reelection in 2016. The open seat was won by Democrat Martha Hennessey against Republican Marie Lobito.

District 6
Incumbent Republican State Senator Sam Cataldo had represented the New Hampshire's 6th State Senate District since 2012. He did not run for reelection in 2016. The open seat was won by Republican James Gray against Democrat Joe Casey.

District 7
Incumbent Democratic State Senator Andrew Hosmer had represented the New Hampshire's 7th State Senate District since 2012. He was defeated by Republican Harold French.

District 8
Incumbent Republican State Senator Jerry Little had represented the New Hampshire's 8th State Senate District since 2014. He did not run for reelection in 2016. The open seat was won by Republican Ruth Ward against Democrat John Garvey.

District 9
Incumbent Republican State Senator Andy Sanborn had represented the New Hampshire's 9th State Senate District since 2012. He won reelection against Democrat Lee Nyquist.

District 10
Incumbent Democrat State Senator Molly Kelly had represented the New Hampshire's 10th State Senate District since 2006. She did not run for reelection in 2016. The open seat was won by Democrat Jay Kahn against Republican Chester Lapointe.

District 11
Incumbent Republican State Senator Gary L. Daniels had represented the New Hampshire's 11th State Senate District since 2014. He won reelection against Democrat Peggy Gilmour.

District 12
Incumbent Republican State Senator Kevin Avard had represented the New Hampshire's 12th State Senate District since 2014. He won reelection against Democrat Peggy Gilmour.

District 13
Incumbent Republican State Senator Bette Lasky had represented the New Hampshire's 13th State Senate District since 2012. She won reelection against Republican Joan Donahue.

District 14
Incumbent Republican State Senator Sharon Carson had represented the New Hampshire's 14th State Senate District since 2008. She won reelection against Democrat Richard Leonard.

District 15
Incumbent Democratic State Senator Dan Feltes had represented the New Hampshire's 15th State Senate District since 2014. He won reelection against Republican Jeff Newman.

District 16
Incumbent Republican State Senator David Boutin had represented the New Hampshire's 16th State Senate District since 2010. He did not run for reelection in 2016. The open seat was won by Democrat Scott McGilvray against Republican State Representative Joe Duarte.

District 17
Incumbent Republican State Senator John Reagan had represented the New Hampshire's 17th State Senate District since 2012. He won reelection against Democrat Nancy R.B. Fraher.

District 18
Incumbent Democratic State Senator Donna Soucy had represented the New Hampshire's 18th State Senate District since 2012. She won reelection against former Republican Ross Terrio.

District 19
Incumbent Republican State Senator Regina Birdsell had represented the New Hampshire's 19th State Senate District since 2014. She won reelection against Democrat Kristi St. Laurent.

District 20
Incumbent Democratic State Senator Lou D'Allesandro had represented the New Hampshire's 20th State Senate District since 1998. He won reelection against Republican Carla Gericke.

District 21
Incumbent Democratic State Senator Martha Fuller Clark had represented the New Hampshire's 21st State Senate District since 2012. She won reelection against Republican Peter Macdonald.

District 22
Incumbent Republican State Senator Chuck Morse had represented the New Hampshire's 22nd State Senate District since 2010. He won reelection against Democrat Richard O'Shaughnessy.

District 23
Incumbent Republican State Senator Russell Prescott had represented the New Hampshire's 23rd State Senate District since 2010. He did not run for reelection in 2016. The open seat was won by Republican Bill Gannon against Democratic State Representative Alexis Simpson.

District 24
Incumbent Republican State Senator Nancy Stiles had represented the New Hampshire's 24th State Senate District since 2010. She did not run for reelection in 2016. The open seat was won by Republican Daniel Innis against Democratic State Representative Tom Sherman.

References

New Hampshire Senate elections
Senate
New Hampshire